Shimla Rural Assembly constituency is one of the 68 constituencies in the Himachal Pradesh Legislative Assembly of Himachal Pradesh a northern state of India. Shimla Rural is also part of Shimla Lok Sabha constituency.

Members of Legislative Assembly

Election results

2022

2017

See also
 Shimla
 Shimla district
 List of constituencies of Himachal Pradesh Legislative Assembly

References

External links
 

Assembly constituencies of Himachal Pradesh
Shimla district